Rodney Menard Young (born January 25, 1973) is a former American football defensive back. He played four seasons in the National Football League (NFL) for the New York Giants (1995–1998). He was the 85th player taken in the 1995 NFL draft. A native of Grambling, Louisiana, Young was a 1990 USA Today All-American for Ruston High School under Coach Jimmy Childress. He played college football at Louisiana State University. He is the son of 10-year NFL player, Willie Young.

References

1973 births
Living people
Sportspeople from Grambling, Louisiana
American football defensive backs
LSU Tigers football players
New York Giants players
Players of American football from Louisiana